Bent and Broken is a remix album by Collide, released on October 26, 2012, by Noiseplus Music.

Reception
ReGen awarded Bent and Broken three and a half out of five and said "this two disc offering of remixes and new material presents all the hallmarks of Collide's lush and atmospheric brand of electro/industrial."

Track listing

Personnel
Adapted from the Bent and Broken liner notes.

Collide
 Eric Anest (as Statik) – keyboards, sequencer, cover art, illustrations, design
 Karin Johnston (as kaRIN) – vocals, cover art, illustrations, design

Additional performers
 DJ Forensic – instruments (2.7)
 Rogerio Silva – guitar (1.5)

Production and design
 Dave Keffer – photography
 Ken Marshall – mastering
 Jennifer Miller – illustrations

Release history

References

External links 
 Bent and Broken at collide.net
 
 Bent and Broken at Bandcamp
 Bent and Broken at iTunes

Collide (band) albums
2012 remix albums